In religion, according to the Book of Mormon Himni was a Nephite missionary and one of the sons of King Mosiah, and brother to the prophet Ammon.  According to the Book, Himni and his three brothers Ammon, Omner, and Aaron left their father, and his people, to travel to the land of the Lamanites in order to preach the gospel to them.
During their sojourn there, Himni was imprisoned and beaten, but eventually aided in the conversion of thousands of Lamanites, who later became the Anti-Nephi-Lehies.

References

Book of Mormon people